Clitheroe in Lancashire, England is known for limestone quarrying, but it also developed a cotton industry.

The mills

See also
:Category:Lists of textile mills in the United Kingdom
List of mills owned by the Lancashire Cotton Corporation Limited
List of mills in Lancashire

References

Bibliography

External links

Grace's Guide

Clitheroe
Clitheroe
Buildings and structures in Ribble Valley
Lists of buildings and structures in Lancashire
Clitheroe